Errant Glacier is a glacier,  long, which lies on the east side of the Holyoake Range and drains south into Nimrod Glacier. This glacier offered a route to the southern party of the New Zealand Geological Survey Antarctic Expedition (1960–61) when they journeyed north from Nimrod Glacier in December 1960. It was named by them to describe the zigzag route of the party in traveling on the glacier in search for a route north.

References 

Glaciers of the Ross Dependency
Shackleton Coast